Rathmines, a division of County Dublin based on the suburb of Rathmines, was a parliamentary constituency in Ireland. It returned one Member of Parliament (MP) to the House of Commons of the Parliament of the United Kingdom from 1918 to 1922.

Before the 1918 general election the area was the northern part of the South Dublin constituency, extended a bit west into territory formerly part of North Dublin. From 1922 it was not represented in the British Parliament.

History
Dublin Rathmines was created under the Redistribution of Seats (Ireland) Act 1918 following recommendations of the 1917 Boundary Commission, which increased the parliamentary representation of the administrative county of Dublin from two divisions to four. The 1918 general election was used by Sinn Féin as an election to the First Dáil.

Under the Government of Ireland Act 1920, the area was combined with Dublin Pembroke, North Dublin and South Dublin as a 6-seat constituency for the Southern Ireland House of Commons and a two-seat constituency at Westminster. At the 1921 election for the Southern Ireland House of Commons, the six seats were won uncontested by Sinn Féin, who treated it as part of the election to the Second Dáil. It was never used as a Westminster constituency; under s. 1(4) of the Irish Free State (Agreement) Act 1922, no writ was to be issued "for a constituency in Ireland other than a constituency in Northern Ireland". Therefore, no vote was held in Dublin County at the 1922 United Kingdom general election on 15 November 1922, shortly before the Irish Free State left the United Kingdom on 6 December 1922.

Boundaries

The Rathmines Division was defined as:

It was a section south of the city of Dublin, extending west into the middle of the county. The constituency was bounded by the city of Dublin to the north, North Dublin to the west, the Pembroke division of County Dublin to the south.

Members of Parliament

Elections

References

Westminster constituencies in County Dublin (historic)
Dáil constituencies in County Dublin (historic)
Constituencies of the Parliament of the United Kingdom established in 1918
Constituencies of the Parliament of the United Kingdom disestablished in 1922
Rathmines